Empress Xiaojingyi (1492 – 26 February 1535), of the Xia clan, was a Chinese empress consort of the Ming dynasty, married to the Zhengde Emperor.

Biography
Lady Xia was the daughter of Xia Ru (夏儒), and she was virtuous and elegant. She was from the district Sang-yuan (in present Nanking). In 1506, she was selected to become the first consort and empress of the emperor. She had no issue and when her spouse died childless in 1521, he was succeeded by his cousin Jiajing. She was given the title Empress Zhuangsu, because she couldn't be an empress dowager.

Titles 
During the reign of the Hongzhi Emperor (r. 1487–1505)
Lady Xia (夏氏; from 1492)
During the reign of the Zhengde Emperor (r. 1505–1521)
Empress (皇后; from 1506)
During the reign of the Jiajing Emperor (r. 1521–1567)
Empress Zhuangsu (莊肅皇后;  from 27 May 1521)
Empress Xiaojing Zhuanghui Ansu  Yi (孝靜莊惠安肅毅皇后; from 1535)
Empress Xiaojing Zhuanghui Ansu Wencheng Shuntian Xiesheng Yi (孝靜莊惠安肅溫誠順天偕聖毅皇后; from 1536)

Notes

1492 births
1535 deaths
Ming dynasty empresses
15th-century Chinese women
15th-century Chinese people
16th-century Chinese women
16th-century Chinese people
People from Beijing